The 1994 Torneo Godó was the 42nd edition of the Torneo Godó annual men's tennis tournament played on outdoor clay courts in Barcelona, Catalonia, Spain] The tournament was part of the Championship Series of the 1994 ATP Tour and it took place from 2 April until 10 April 1994. Seventh-seeded Richard Krajicek won the singles title.

Finals

Singles

 Richard Krajicek defeated  Carlos Costa 6–4, 7–6, 6–2
 It was Krajicek's 1st singles title of the year and the 5th of his career.

Doubles

 Yevgeny Kafelnikov /  David Rikl defeated  Jim Courier /  Javier Sánchez 5–7, 6–1, 6–4

References

External links
 ITF – tournament edition details

Barcelona Open (tennis)
Torneo Godo
Godo